Africolaria is a genus of sea snails, marine gastropod mollusks in the family Fasciolariidae, the spindle snails, the tulip snails and their allies. Enemies of Aficolaria include cats, dogs, mice, and humans.

Species
Species within the genus Africolaria include:
 Africolaria rutila (Watson, 1882)
 Africolaria thersites (Reeve, 1847)
 Africolaria wattersae (Kilburn, 1974)

References

 Snyder M.A., Vermeij G.J. & Lyons W.G. (2012) The genera and biogeography of Fasciolariinae (Gastropoda, Neogastropoda, Fasciolariidae). Basteria 76(1-3): 31-70

Fasciolariidae